The 2020 Puerto Rico gubernatorial election was held on November 3, 2020, to elect the governor of Puerto Rico, concurrently with the election of the Resident Commissioner, the Senate, the House of Representatives, and the mayors of the 78 municipalities. Incumbent New Progressive Party Governor Wanda Vázquez Garced, who succeeded to the governorship on August 7, 2019, was eligible to run for a full term in office, which she announced on December 16, 2019.

However, Vázquez Garced lost her bid when former Resident Commissioner Pedro Pierluisi won the New Progressive Party membership vote on the nomination for governor. Pierluisi ultimately won the election on November 3, 2020, albeit by a narrow margin of 1.37%. As a result, this election was the closest race of the 2020 gubernatorial election cycle. Pierlusi's winning 32.93% of the vote was the lowest obtained by a successful gubernatorial candidate in Puerto Rico since the first direct election in 1948.

Electoral system 
The Governor of Puerto Rico is elected via first-past-the-post voting.

New Progressive Party
On March 3, 2019, Ricardo Rosselló announced he would seek re-election as governor in the 2020 elections; however, following the Telegramgate scandal and subsequent protests in front of La Fortaleza, Rosselló announced on July 21, 2019, that he would withdraw his bid for re-election. Shortly thereafter, on August 2, he resigned as governor.

On September 9, 2019, Pedro Pierluisi, who served briefly as de facto governor following Rosselló's resignation, announced he would seek the PNP nomination for governor for the 2020 elections.

On December 19, 2019, Governor Wanda Vázquez Garced, who was elevated to governor on August 7, 2019, after Pierluisi's appointment was deemed unconstitutional, announced her intention to seek re-election to a full term as governor.

On August 16, 2020, in an extended primary process marred by troubles delivering ballots to polling places for the original primary date of August 9, Pierluisi defeated Vázquez Garced.

Candidates

Nominated
Pedro Pierluisi, former Resident Commissioner of Puerto Rico

Eliminated in primary
Wanda Vázquez Garced, incumbent Governor

Withdrawn
Ricardo Rosselló, former Governor of Puerto Rico
Iván González Cancel, former Secretary of Health of Puerto Rico and PNP candidate for the 2012 Puerto Rico gubernatorial election

Polling

Results

Popular Democratic Party
After the defeat of Popular Democratic candidate David Bernier in the 2016 Puerto Rico gubernatorial elections, the party was mostly divided in opinions on how to move forward to the 2020 elections. While many in the party wanted to keep going with the same ideology of the Free Associated State, Carmen Yulín Cruz expressed a desire to create a new movement in the party, one that would support a free association of Puerto Rico as an independent country from the United States.

On August 16, 2020, in an extended primary process marred by troubles delivering ballots to polling places for the original primary date of August 9, Delgado defeated Bhatia and Cruz.

Candidates

Nominated
Carlos Delgado Altieri, mayor of Isabela

Eliminated in primary
Eduardo Bhatia, Minority Leader of the Puerto Rico Senate
Carmen Yulín Cruz, mayor of San Juan, and former member of the Puerto Rico House of Representatives

Withdrawn
Roberto Prats, former member of the Senate of Puerto Rico
Juan Zaragoza, former Secretary of Treasury of Puerto Rico

Polling

Results

Other candidates

Independence Party
On December 27, 2019, the Puerto Rican Independence Party (PIP) filed its list of candidates for the general election, including Sen. Juan Dalmau as governor. Dalmau previously ran as the PIP candidate in the 2012 Puerto Rico gubernatorial election.

Nominee
Juan Dalmau Ramírez, at-large member of the Senate of Puerto Rico

Citizens Victory Movement 
After the defeat of Alexandra Lúgaro as an independent candidate and Rafael Bernabe as the candidate for the Working People's Party in the 2016 Puerto Rico gubernatorial election, the two candidates joined with other Puerto Rican politicians in March 2019 to form a new political party called Movimiento Victoria Ciudadana (Citizen's Victory Movement).

On November 19, 2019, Alexandra Lúgaro announced her second run for governor, this time running as the MVC candidate.

Nominee

Alexandra Lúgaro, businesswoman, lawyer, and 2016 independent candidate for governor.

Project Dignity
Project Dignity was certified as an official party by the CEE (State Commission on Elections) on January 22, 2020. It needed 47,406 petitions of endorsement to be certified, of which it received 47,856. 

On May 20, 2020, the party announced that Dr. César Vazquez would be their gubernatorial nominee.

Nominee
César Vázquez, Cardiologist

Independent
On May 5, 2020, the CEE (State Commission on Elections) certified the candidacy of Eliezer Molina after a legal dispute over the amount of endorsements required to ratify his nomination.

Declared
Eliezer Molina, Agroculturist and Civil Engineer

Polling

with Pedro Pierluisi

with Wanda Vázquez

Results

See also
2020 United States gubernatorial elections

Notes

References

External links
Official campaign websites
 Juan Dalmau (PIP) for Governor
 Carlos Delgado Altieri (PPD) for Governor 
 Eliezer Molina (I) for Governor 
 Pedro Pierluisi (PNP / D) for Governor 

2020
Governor
Puerto Rico